Eas Mòr (Gaelic for "big waterfall") is the name of a number of waterfalls in Scotland:
Eas Mòr, Arran
Eas Mòr, Auchness
Eas Mòr, Bernera
Eas Mòr, Durinish
Eas Mòr, Glen Brittle
Eas Mòr, Kames River
Eas Mòr, Minginish
Eas Mòr, Mull
Eas Mòr burn, Puck's Glen, Cowal
Eas Mòr, River Torridon
Eas Mòr (lower)
Eas Mòr (upper)